The 20th British Academy Film Awards, given by the British Academy of Film and Television Arts in 1967, honoured the best films of 1966.

Winners and nominees

Statistics

See also
 39th Academy Awards
 19th Directors Guild of America Awards
 24th Golden Globe Awards
 19th Writers Guild of America Awards

References

Film020
British Academy Film Awards
British Academy Film Awards